Adela Calva Reyes (1967 – 2 March 2018) was an indigenous Mexican writer, author and playwright of the Otomi people.

Biography
Adela was born in 1967 in San Ildefonso, Tepejí del Río, State of Hidalgo. She remembered poverty in her childhood.

She died on March 4, 2018, in Pachuca, State of Hidalgo.

Works
 Ra hua ra hiä Alas a la palabra (2008, Conaculta)

See also
 Otomi language

References

1967 births
2018 deaths
Writers from Hidalgo (state)
Native American women writers
Otomi people
Indigenous Mexican women
20th-century Native Americans
21st-century Native Americans
20th-century Native American women
21st-century Native American women